Gustavo Alexandre Hemkemeier (born 19 June 1997) is a Brazilian footballer who plays as a midfielder for Etzella.

Career

Club career

Hemkemeier started his career with Brazilian top flight side Toledo, where he made 13 appearances and scored 1 goal. On 21 January 2018, he debuted for Toledo during a 1–0 win over Cascavel. On 29 January 2020, Hemkemeier scored his first goal  for Toledo during a 1–3 loss to Londrina. In 2018, he was sent on loan to Próspera in the Brazilian third tier. In 2020, Hemkemeier signed for Luxembourgish club Etzella.

International career

He is eligible to represent Luxembourg internationally.

References

External links
 

1997 births
Association football midfielders
Brazilian expatriate footballers
Brazilian expatriate sportspeople in Luxembourg
Brazilian footballers
Brazilian people of Luxembourgian descent
Brusque Futebol Clube players
Campeonato Catarinense players
Campeonato Paranaense players
Expatriate footballers in Luxembourg
FC Etzella Ettelbruck players
Living people
Toledo Esporte Clube players
People from Toledo, Paraná
Sportspeople from Paraná (state)
21st-century Brazilian people